Robert Paul Gray (born 28 January 1970 in Portsmouth) is a Northern Irish former footballer who played as a forward.

Club career
Gray started his career in Northern Ireland with Bangor, and was still a teenager when he began playing for the first-team before moving to Luton Town in 1986. He rose through the youth ranks at the club, eventually signing professional terms in 1988. He made his first-team debut in December 1989 against Arsenal. He made a further six appearances during the 1989–90 season, but did not feature the following season, and was sold to Wigan Athletic. He made his debut for the Latics in August 1991 against Shrewsbury Town. Gray appeared five times in the first-team before suffering a serious ankle injury against Sheffield United which would end his professional career. He returned to Bangor in 1993, and played out the rest of his career in Northern Ireland.

International career
Although Gray was born in England, he grew up in Northern Ireland and represented the country at youth level. His only under-21 cap came as a substitute against Israel in 1990.

References

External links
 Paul Gray career stats at Post War Football League Database
 Profile at NIFG

1970 births
Living people
Footballers from Portsmouth
Association football forwards
Bangor F.C. players
Luton Town F.C. players
Wigan Athletic F.C. players
English Football League players
Ards F.C. players
Association footballers from Northern Ireland